Ctirad and Šárka (Czech: Ctirad a Šárka) is an outdoor sculpture by Josef Václav Myslbek, installed at Vyšehradské sady in Vyšehrad, Prague, Czech Republic. It depicts Ctirad and Šárka of Slavic mythology and the Bohemian tale The Maidens' War, when women after the death of Libuše built the castle Děvín lying on the opposite hill of the Vyšehrad.

References

External links

 

Outdoor sculptures in Prague
Sculptures of men in Prague
Sculptures of women in Prague
Sculptures of mythology
Statues in Prague